The sundari or sundri is a double reed wind instrument. It has 7 to 9 holes and is made of shisam on lathe.

The method of playing the sundari is similar to that of playing the shehnai. It is played in medium and fast tempo; slow tempo pieces are not possible in sundari because it is a very short and tiny instrument.

Exponents
Some exponents are Dr.Pramod Gaikwad,  
Namrata Gaikwad John, Sumar Suleman Jumam, Surmani Bhimanna Jadhav, Sidhram Jadhav, Chidanand Jadav, Kapil Jadhav and Ramju Langa.

References

External links
 Surmani Bhimanna Jadhav and party

Double-reed instruments
Indian musical instruments